Victor Alfredo Griffith Mullins (born 12 December 2000) is a Panamanian professional footballer who plays as midfielder for Portland Timbers 2 and the Panama national team.

Club career
Griffith made his professional debut with Santos Guápiles in a 4-2 Liga FPD win over Limón F.C. on 3 March 2019.

International career
Griffith debuted with the Panama national team in a friendly 1-0 win over Costa Rica on 10 October 2020.

References

External links
 

2000 births
Living people
Sportspeople from Panama City
Panamanian footballers
Panama international footballers
Panama youth international footballers
Association football midfielders
Tauro F.C. players
Liga Panameña de Fútbol players
Liga FPD players
Panamanian expatriate footballers
Expatriate footballers in Costa Rica
Panamanian expatriate sportspeople in Costa Rica
2021 CONCACAF Gold Cup players
Panama under-20 international footballers
Portland Timbers 2 players
MLS Next Pro players